A.E Ermionida F.C. is a Greek football club based in Kranidi, Argolis, Greece.

History
The club was founded in 2011 after the merge of A.E.K. Kranidi and Ermis Ermioni.

The club earned promotion to the second tier for the first time in the 2013–14 season. Despite having an amazing season in the Football League during the 2014–15 season and finishing 5th collecting 41 points out of 24 matches, the club got relegated through the play-offs.

The club badge resembles Hermes, one of the 12 Olympian gods in Ancient Greek religion.

Honours

Domestic
Gamma Ethniki
Winners (1): 2013–14
 Delta Ethniki
 Winners (1): 2012–13
 Argolis FCA Cup
 Winners (1): 2017–18

 
Football clubs in Peloponnese (region)
Gamma Ethniki clubs